Kashipur Assembly constituency may refer to 
 Kashipur, West Bengal Assembly constituency
 Kashipur, Uttarakhand Assembly constituency
 Kashipur-Belgachhia Assembly constituency